Sulettaria is a genus of flowering plants in the family Zingiberaceae. The plants of the genus were formerly in the genus Elettaria until 2018. 

Sulettaria are native to Malaysia and Indonesia.

 Sulettaria brachycalyx S.Sakai & Nagam. - Sarawak
 Sulettaria kapitensis S.Sakai & Nagam. - Sarawak
 Sulettaria linearicrista S.Sakai & Nagam. - Sarawak, Brunei
 Sulettaria longipilosa S.Sakai & Nagam. - Sarawak
 Sulettaria longituba (Ridl.) Holttum - Sumatra, Peninsular Malaysia
 Sulettaria multiflora (Ridl.) R.M.Sm. - Sumatra, Sarawak
 Sulettaria rubida R.M.Sm. - Sabah, Sarawak
 Sulettaria stoloniflora (K.Schum.) S.Sakai & Nagam. - Sarawak
 Sulettaria surculosa (K.Schum.) B.L.Burtt & R.M.Sm. - Sarawak

References

Medicinal plants of Asia
Zingiberaceae genera